Zorotypus is a genus of angel insects in the family Zorotypidae.

Species 

The type  species is Zorotypus guineensis from West Africa.

Other species are found worldwide, mainly in tropical and subtropical regions. Four species occur north of the Tropic of Cancer, two in the Americas and others in Asia and Africa.

Genus Zorotypus Silvestri, 1913
 Subgenus Zorotypus Silvestri, 1913
 Species Zorotypus amazonensis Rafael & Engel, 2006 – Brazil (Amazonas)
 Species Zorotypus asymmetristernum Mashimo, 2018 – Kenya
 Species Zorotypus caxiuana Rafael, Godoi & Engel, 2008 – Brazil (Pará)
 Species Zorotypus delamarei Paulian, 1949 – Madagascar
 Species Zorotypus guineensis Silvestri, 1913 – Ghana, Guinea, Ivory Coast
 Species Zorotypus shannoni Gurney, 1938 – Brazil (Amazonas, Mato Grosso)
 Species Zorotypus vinsoni Paulian, 1951 – Mauritius
 Species †Zorotypus absonus Engel, 2008 – Dominican Republic (Miocene)
 Species †Zorotypus denticulatus Yin, Cai & Huang, 2018
 Species †Zorotypus dilaticeps Yin, Cai, Huang & Engel, 2018
 Species †Zorotypus goeleti Engel & Grimaldi, 2000 – Dominican Republic (Miocene)
 Species †Zorotypus mnemosyne Engel, 2008 – Dominican Republic (Miocene)
 Species †Zorotypus palaeus Poinar, 1988 – Dominican Republic (Miocene)
 Subgenus †Octozoros Engel, 2003
 Species †Zorotypus acanthothorax Engel & Grimaldi, 2002 – Myanmar (Cretaceous)
 Species †Zorotypus cenomanianus Yin, Cai & Huang, 2018 – Myanmar (Cretaceous)
 Species †Zorotypus hirsutus Mashimo, 2018 – Myanmar (Cretaceous)
 Species †Zorotypus hudae (Kaddumi, 2005) – Jordan (Cretaceous)
 Species †Zorotypus hukawngi Chen & Su, 2019
 Species †Zorotypus nascimbenei Engel & Grimaldi, 2002 – Myanmar (Cretaceous)
 Species †Zorotypus pecten Mashimo, 2019
 Species †Zorotypus pusillus Chen & Su, 2019
 Species †Zorotypus cretatus Engel & Grimaldi, 2002 – Myanmar (Cretaceous)
 Species †Zorotypus oligophleps Liu, Zhang, Cai & Li, 2018
 Species †Zorotypus robustus Liu, Zhang, Cai & Li, 2018

 Zoraptera incertae sedis
 Species Zorotypus congensis Van-Ryn-Tournel, 1971 – Congo (Dem.Rep.)
 Species Zorotypus javanicus Silvestri, 1913 – Indonesia (Java)
 Species Zorotypus juninensis Engel, 2000 – Peru
 Species Zorotypus lawrencei New, 1995 – Christmas Island
 Species Zorotypus leleupi Weidner, 1976 – Ecuador (Galapagos Islands)
 Species Zorotypus longicercatus Caudell, 1927 – Jamaica
 Species Zorotypus newi (Chao & Chen, 2000) – Taiwan
 Species Zorotypus sechellensis Zompro, 2005 – Seychelles
 Species Zorotypus swezeyi Caudell, 1922 – United States (Hawaii)

References

External Links

Taxa named by Filippo Silvestri
Zoraptera
Insect genera